The 2023 Super Rugby Aupiki season is the second edition of the competition. It began on 25 February 2023 with Hurricanes Poua and Chiefs Manawa playing the opening match. The final is expected to be played on 25 March 2023.

Competition format
All four teams will have three regular season matches and two play-off matches. There will be a total of ten matches played over five weeks. The semifinals will be played on 19 March, and the finals will also include the third-fourth play-off on 25 March.

Standings
The current standings for the 2023 Super Rugby Aupiki season are:
 

Source: Sky Super Rugby Aupiki – Team standings

Matches

Round 1

Round 2

Round 3

Finals

Semifinals

Third place play-off

Final

Statistics

Leading point scorers

Source: Sky Super Rugby Aupiki: Player Stats

Leading try scorers

Source: Sky Super Rugby Aupiki: Player Stats

Discipline

Players 
Squads for 2023 season.

Squads

References

External link 
 Official website

2023
2023 in women's rugby union